Dagon is a genus of South American butterflies of the family Nymphalidae.

Species
 Dagon pusilla Salvin, 1869
 Dagon catula Hopffer, 1874 – Catula crescent
 Dagon morena Röber, 1913

References
"Dagon Higgins, 1981" at Markku Savela's Lepidoptera and Some Other Life Forms (Archived by WebCite at https://web.archive.org/web/20090212214947/http://www.nic.funet.fi/pub/sci/bio/life/insecta/lepidoptera/ditrysia/papilionoidea/nymphalidae/nymphalinae/dagon/index.html

Melitaeini
Nymphalidae of South America
Butterfly genera
Taxa named by Robert P. Higgins